Guillestre (Vivaro-Alpine: Guilhèstra) is a commune in the Hautes-Alpes department in southeastern France.

Geography
The village lies in the northwestern part of the commune, on the left bank of the Chagne, a stream, tributary of the Guil, which forms all of the commune's northern border, before flowing into the Durance, which forms part of the commune's western border.
The village also lies high within the alps of France.

Population

See also
Communes of the Hautes-Alpes department

References

Communes of Hautes-Alpes
Hautes-Alpes communes articles needing translation from French Wikipedia